A rash is a change of the skin which affects its color, appearance, or texture.

Rash may also refer to:


People
 Rash (surname)
 Rash Behari Bose (1886–1945), Indian revolutionary
 Rash Behari Ghosh (1845–1921), Indian politician, lawyer, social worker and philanthropist
 Rash Sarkar (born 1944), Indian former cricketer

Arts and entertainment
 Rash (novel), a 2006 young adult novel
 Rash (film), a 2005 Australian documentary
 Rash!!, a manga series
 Rash Masum, a fictional character in the medical drama series Casualty
 Rash, one of the three Battletoads (characters) in the video game series, cartoon and comic strips

Other uses
 Rash, Alabama, United States, an unincorporated community
 Red and Anarchist Skinheads, a left-wing, anti-racist, anti-fascist skinhead group

See also
 List of people known as the Rash
 Rasher (disambiguation)
 

Masculine given names